Llewellyn Anthony Gonsalvez (born 11 September 1973) is an Indian film editor from Tamil Nadu. He was introduced to cinema through film director Gautham Vasudev Menon by the film Kaakha Kaakha. He continued to collaborated with Gautham V. Menon by Vettaiyaadu Vilaiyaadu, Pachaikili Muthucharam, Vaaranam Aayiram, Vinnaithaandi Varuvaayaa, Neethaane En Ponvasantham, Yennai Arindhaal, Achcham Yenbadhu Madamaiyada and Vendhu Thanindhathu Kaadu. Following the success of these films, director Shankar has collaborated with him through Enthiran. He has worked in over two-hundred Tamil, Malayalam, Telugu, Hindi and Kannada films. He is the editor for India's most expensive feature film 2.0.

Career
Anthony studied a degree in literature at Madras Christian College, Tambaram, but found himself unsure of a career path once he has finished his education. Following suggestions from his friends, he began learning about animation at Prasad Studio and subsequently also enrolled to learn about editing. He thereafter, received offers to work on corporate ads, trailers and documentaries from 1993 for Edit Point and continued to work in the same practice till 2004, often collaborating with leading ad film makers like Rajiv Menon. He then began to work on editing songs in films occasionally, also gaining experience by editing tele-films. Director Gautham Vasudev Menon asked Anthony to edit the song "Ennai Konjam" in Kaakha Kaakha for the audio release event of that film. Impressed with his work for that song, he asked him to sign on as the film's editor. He has since associated with major directors in Tamil cinema, collaborating regularly with directors including Shankar, AR Murugadoss, Gautham Vasudev Menon, Linguswamy, K. V. Anand and A. L. Vijay.

Anthony has also nurtured an ambition to direct films and began pre-production on a comedy film titled Jagathalapradhaban in November 2008 featuring Jayaram, Yuhi Sethu and Namitha. The film, however failed to take off. Anthony revealed in August 2014 that he was set to make his first film, and it would be the remake of the Malayalam film Shutter (2012). In November 2014, he announced and began work on the venture featuring Sathyaraj in the lead role. The film also stars Anumol, Kalyani Natarajan and Dixitha Kothari.

Filmography

References

External links
 

Telugu film editors
1973 births
Living people
Madras Christian College alumni
Filmfare Awards South winners
Tamil film editors
Malayalam film editors
Kannada film editors
Film editors from Tamil Nadu
Artists from Chennai